Profound Lore Records is a Canadian independent record label founded in May 2004, which "began as the 'hobby-like venture' of a few friends but, over the past six years, the label has evolved into a one-man enterprise, shaped a distinct 'aesthetic identity' and provided owner Chris Bruni with a full-time job."

Artists 
Abyssal
Agalloch
Alcest
Altar of Plagues
Amber Asylum
Amesoeurs
The Angelic Process
Artificial Brain
Asunder
Ash Borer
Atavist
The Atlas Moth
Bell Witch
Bosse-de-Nage
Blacklist
Bloody Panda
Caïna
Castevet
Cobalt
Coffinworm
Crucifist
Dälek
Disma
Full of Hell
The Gates of Slumber
Hammers of Misfortune
The Howling Wind
Impetuous Ritual
Infernal Coil
Krallice
Lingua Ignota
Locrian
Ludicra
Menace Ruine
Mitochondrion
Monarch!
Nadja
Of Feather and Bone
Old Man Gloom
Pallbearer
Pissgrave
Portal
Prurient
Pyramids
Saros
Sannhet
Slough Feg
Subrosa
Sumac
The Temple
Vasaeleth
Wayfarer
Winterfylleth
Witch Mountain
Wold
Wolvhammer
Worm Ouroboros
Wrath of the Weak
Yakuza
Yob

Catalog

References 

Canadian independent record labels
Record labels established in 2004
Heavy metal record labels